Brittany Ann O'Grady (born June 2, 1996) is an American actress and singer. 
She is known for her leading roles in the Fox series Star (2016–2019), and the Apple TV+ series Little Voice (2020), as well as her role in the first season of the HBO anthology series The White Lotus (2021), and a lead role in the Amazon Prime series The Consultant (2023). She has also acted in the film Black Christmas (2019).

Career
After appearing in several television shows, O'Grady landed her first main role on television in 2016 with musical series Star with the role of Simone Davis. She also landed her first film roles in 2019 with Above Suspicion as Georgia Beale and Black Christmas as Jesse Bolton-Sinclair. In 2021, she starred as Paula in the HBO series The White Lotus. O'Grady starred in Kygo's "Love Me Now" music video as Kygo's love interest. O'Grady has also appeared on The Wayne Ayers Podcast.

Personal life
O'Grady states that her father is White, with Irish ancestry, while her mother is African-American/Creole, from Louisiana. Due to being mixed race, she says her Irish last name sometimes throws people off. She has spoken in interviews about the challenges of navigating stereotypes and ignorance about what different races are supposedly expected to look like. Since 2015, she has been in a relationship with Ben Huyard, and they married on September 10, 2022. Her former co-stars Ryan Destiny, Jude Demorest and Amiyah Scott from Star served as bridesmaids.

Filmography

Television

Film

References

External links
 

1996 births
21st-century American actresses
African-American actresses
21st-century African-American women singers
American contemporary R&B singers
American hip hop singers
American people of Irish descent
American television actresses
Living people
People from Arlington County, Virginia
Washington-Liberty High School alumni